The DB Draught Classic was a major thoroughbred horse race in New Zealand. Run at Ellerslie Racecourse in early March it was called New Zealand's first million-dollar race. However it was run only twice,  1989 and 1990, for total stake money of $950,000 and $970,000 respectively.

The race had Group 1 status and was run over 2100m. Both editions were won by the 1989 Japan Cup winner Horlicks.

See also

 Thoroughbred racing in New Zealand

References

Horse races in New Zealand